William C. Brown (17 December 1878 – 25 August 1980) was a British racewalker. He competed in the men's 3500 metres walk at the 1908 Summer Olympics.

See also
 List of centenarians (sportspeople)

References

1878 births
1980 deaths
Athletes (track and field) at the 1908 Summer Olympics
British male racewalkers
Olympic athletes of Great Britain
Place of birth missing
British centenarians
Men centenarians